Route 120 is a short highway in Holt County.  Its eastern terminus is at Route B about eight miles (13 km) northeast of Oregon.  Its western terminus is at U.S. Route 59 about three miles (5 km) west of its eastern terminus.  No towns are on the highway.

Route description
Route 120 begins at an intersection with US 59 north of Oregon, heading east on a two-lane undivided road. The route passes through agricultural areas with some trees, curving to the southeast before heading east again. Route 120 comes to its eastern terminus at an intersection with Route B near New Point.

History

Major intersections

References

120
Transportation in Holt County, Missouri